Verotika is a 2019 American anthology horror film written, directed and scored by Glenn Danzig. Based on a line of comic books published by Danzig's company Verotik, the film stars Rachel Alig, Alice Haig, Natalia Borowsky, Sean Kanan, Scotch Hopkins, Ashley Wisdom, and Kayden Kross.

Premise
The film consists of three segments. The first segment, "The Albino Spider of Dajette", is about a Parisian sex worker with eyeballs for nipples named Dajette and an albino spider that takes the form of an eight-armed humanoid, the latter of whom murders sex workers by breaking their necks. The second segment, "Change of Face", concerns a mysterious stripper who collects the faces of other women. The final segment, "Drukija Contessa of Blood", follows a countess who kills virgin women and bathes in their blood.

Cast

"The Albino Spider of Dajette"
 Ashley Wisdom as Dajette
 Scotch Hopkins as the Albino Spider
 Paul Vandervort as Francois
 James Cullen Bressack as Passerby
 Tonya Kay as Platinum Model

"Change of Face"
 Rachel Alig as Mystery Girl
 Sean Kanan as Sgt. Anders
 Courtney Stodden as Pretty Blonde
 Sean Waltman as Counter Person

"Drukija Contessa of Blood"
 Alice Haig as Drukija
 Kayden Kross as Morella
 Natalia Borowsky as Sheska
 Caroline Williams as Peasant Woman
 Kansas Bowling as Young Peasant Girl
 Brennah Black as Blonde Girl

Production
The film is based on comic books by published by Verotik, a company owned by writer-director Glenn Danzig. Danzig has referred to Verotika as a "tribute" to horror anthology films such as Black Sabbath and Trilogy of Terror.

The third segment in the film, "Drukija Contessa of Blood", has been described as "a take" on historical figure and murderer Elizabeth Báthory.

Release and reception
Verotika premiered on June 13, 2019 at the Cinepocalypse film festival in Chicago, Illinois. Throughout the screening, the film elicited laughter from the audience. In a Q&A session following the showing, Danzig asserted that he did not intend for the film to be comedic, stating that viewers laughed at parts that "[he] wouldn't have".

The film had its international premiere at the Sitges International Fantastic Film Festival in Catalonia, Spain on October 4, 2019.

Verotika was panned by critics, with multiple publications comparing it to the 2003 film The Room, which is commonly considered to be one of the worst films ever made. Patrick Bromley of Bloody Disgusting wrote that "the audience reaction at Cinepocalypse suggests that Verotika has a future as a midnight movie in the same vein as The Room. There's plenty of entertainment and plenty of laughs to be had, even if I'm not sure it's what director Danzig originally intended. Creating a new horror cult favorite might just be the most punk rock thing he could have done." Nick Allen of Vulture wrote that Verotika "[follows] in the tradition of Ed Wood and Tommy Wiseau", and noted that Danzig may have unwittingly created "the horror-comedy of the year". Alex McLevy of The A.V. Club called the film "funny on a level that most comedies can't achieve. It's that rare fusion of painstakingly expressed love and total lack of ability that deliver the best of bad cinema, and [Danzig] should be proud."

Home media
The film was released on Blu-ray and DVD in March 2020.

References

External links
 
 

2019 horror films
2019 films
American horror anthology films
Live-action films based on comics
Films about spiders
Films based on American comics
Films about prostitution in Paris
Films about murderers
Films set in Paris
2010s English-language films
2010s American films